Bis(dimethylamino)methane is the organic compound with the formula [(CH3)2N]2CH2.  It is classified as an aminal as well as a ditertiary amine, in fact the simplest.  It is a colorless liquid that is widely available.  It is prepared by the reaction of dimethylamine and formaldehyde:
 2 (CH3)2NH  +  CH2O →   [(CH3)2N]2CH2  +  H2O

It is used for the dimethylaminomethylation reactions, the reaction being initiated by the addition of a strong, anhydrous acid:
 [(CH3)2N]2CH2  +  H+  →   (CH3)2NCH2+  +  (CH3)2NH

Related reagents
N,N,N′,N′-Tetramethylformamidinium chloride
Eschenmoser's salt is used for similar applications.

References

Tertiary amines
Dimethylamino compounds